Fernando Alloni (11 May 1925 – 29 January 2015) was an Italian speed skater. He competed in the men's 5000 metres event at the 1948 Winter Olympics.

References

External links
 

1925 births
2015 deaths
Italian male speed skaters
Olympic speed skaters of Italy
Speed skaters at the 1948 Winter Olympics
Sportspeople from Milan
20th-century Italian people